Neighborhood Music is the fifth studio album by Mexican-American Chicano rap recording artist Lil Rob from San Diego, California. It was released on February 17, 2004, via Upstairs Records.

Track listing

Charts

References

External links

2004 albums
Lil Rob albums
Gangsta rap albums by American artists